Victor DeJesus, better known by his stage name Thirstin Howl the 3rd, is an American rapper, producer, author and entrepreneur from Brownsville, Brooklyn. Howl owns and operates his own label, Skillionaire Enterprises. He is also a founding member of the Lo Lifes.

Lo Lifes

In 1988, Thirstin Howl the 3rd and Rack-Lo co-founded the Lo Lifes, a Ralph Lauren Polo "boosting" (shoplifting) crew that formed from the union of two smaller crews: Ralphie's Kids from Crown Heights and Polo USA (United Shoplifters Association) from Brownsville. In the original 2016 edition of Howl's book Bury Me With the Lo On (a second edition was released in 2017), Howl writes:

Howl has also stated of the Lo Lifes:

Bury Me With the Lo On takes its name from the lyrics of Howl's song, "The Polo Rican" ("When I die, bury me with the Lo on / Official to the death, all eternity and so on"), as well as a photo that appears in the book of a Lo Life member wearing a Polo ski sweater in his coffin. 

In August 2015 Howl launched a Lo Life clothing line inspired by vintage Ralph Lauren, in partnership with Willie Esco of Coogi.

Music career

Howl was first recognized by music publications in 1997, when he was profiled in The Source's Unsigned Hype column, but continued to exercise creative control by producing his own music and videos. His music has been featured on Lyricist Lounge, Volume One (“Bathroom Cipher”) and Soundbombing II (“Brooklyn Hardrock”).

Of Puerto Rican descent, Howl is bilingual and is known for rapping in both Spanish and English. With his catalogue including tracks about topics as various as living with his mom, Hanna-Barbera character Penelope Pitstop, and Ralph Lauren Polo, he has been described by Nate Patrin of Stereogum as "one of the least-precedented, never-imitated voices in underground hip-hop."

Discography

Studio albums
Skillionaire (1999)
Skillosopher (2000)
Serial Skiller (2001)
Skilligan's Island (2002)
 Fire & Ice (2003) with Father Time & Godforbid as Alaskan Fishermen
Skillitary (2004)
La Cura (2006)
Lo Down & Dirty with Rack-Lo (2006) 
Natural Born Skiller (2011)
 Mami & Papi (2013) with Hurricane G 
Survival of the Skillest (2013)
Skillmatic (2017)

Mixtapes
Skilluminaty (2005)
 The Lo-Life General (2006)
Chuletas Con Tostones (2009)
Skill Recognize Skill with J-Love (2010)
Brother Lo The 37th Chamber (200?)

Compilations
Love And Loyalty - The Sound Track (2000)
Licensed to Skill (2003)

Singles
"Brooklyn Hard Rock" (12") (1999)
"The Polorican" (12") (1999)

Featured guest appearances

 Statik Selektah - "Ralph Lauren’s Closet” (from the album The Balancing Act) (2020)

 The Nicewun JM - “Underground Livin’” (from the album Celebratin’ Hip Hop... Over Here) (2021)

 The Mighty Rhino - “We Gon’ Stomp Shit” (also featuring Tragedy Khadafi, Guilty Simpson, Bonshah, Fraction and Ultra Magnus, from the album To Relieve The Sorrow-Laden Heart) (2022)

References

Living people
Puerto Rican rappers
Place of birth missing (living people)
Year of birth missing (living people)
People from Brownsville, Brooklyn
21st-century American rappers
Fashion influencers